Ivan Shamiakin (30 January 1921 – 14 October 2004) was a Soviet Belarusian writer, perhaps one of the most prolific of the Soviet BSSR, writing in a socialist realist style.

He was born in 1921 in the village of Karma, Gomel Region, Belarus, studied construction engineering in a vocational school in 1940, then fought in World War II, taking part in battles near Murmansk and in Poland. After the war he studied at the Homel Pedagogical University, worked as an editor and had different Communist Party positions in the local party offices in Belarus.
In 1958 Shamiakin, along with some other Belarusian writers, took part in the anti-Boris Pasternak campaign. In 1991 he confessed that he had never been familiar with Pasternak and never read Doctor Zhivago, but had followed in the steps of older comrades. Shamiakin also mentioned Pasternak's "typically Jewish cowardice".

In 1963 Shamiakin worked at the United Nations as part of the Belarusian UN delegation. In 1980 he became the chief editor of the Byelorussian Soviet Encyclopedia and remained in this position until 1992. In 1994 he became the academician of the National Academy of Sciences.

Books

Novels
 Hlybokaja Plyn (Deep streams), 1949
 U dobry chas (In the Good Times), 1953
 Niepautornaja viasna (Unrepeatable Spring), 1957 — a part of the pentalogy Tryvoznaje scascie (Restless Happiness)
 Krynicy (The Springs), 1957
 Nachnyja zarnicy (Lightnings in the Summer Night), 1958 — a part of the pentology Tryvoznaje scascie (Restless Happiness)
 Ahon i snieh (Fire and Snow), 1959 — a part of the pentology Tryvoznaje scascie (Restless Happiness)
 Poshuki i sustrechy (Searching and getting together), 1959 — a part of the  Tryvoznaje scascie (Restless Happiness)
 Serca na daloni (The Heart on the Open Palm), 1964
 Most (The Bridge), 1965  — a part of the pentology Tryvoznaje scascie (Restless Happiness)
 Snieznyja zimy (Snowy winters), 1970
 Atlanty i karyjatydy (Telamones and Caryatides), 1974
 Vazmu tvoj bol (I will take your pain), 1979
 Petrahrad-Brest (Petrograd-Brest), 1983
 Zenit (Zenith), 1987
 Zlaja zorka (Wicked Star), 1993

Shorter novels and short stories collections
 Pomsta (Revenge), 1945
 Na znajomych shlachach (On the Familiar Path), 1949
 Dzvie sily (Two Forces), 1951
 Apaviadanni (Stories), 1952
 Piershaje spatkannie (The First Date), 1956
 Matchyny ruki (Mother's Hands), 1961
 Viacherni seans (Late-evening movie), 1968
 Lios majho ziemlaka (The Fate of My Fellow Countryman), 1970
 Backa i dzieci (Father and children), 1971
 Sciahi pad shtykami (Flags under bayonets), 1976
 Handlarka i paet. Shlubnaja noch. (Saleswoman and poet. Prima notte), 1976
 U rodnaj siamji (In the Native Family), 1986
 Drama (Drama), 1990
 Apoviesci Ivana Andrejevicha (Stories of Ivan Andreevich), 1993
 Dzie sciezki tyja... (Where are those paths...), 1993
 Padziennie (The Falling), 1994
 Sataninski tur (Satan's tour), 1995

Plays
 Nie viercie cishyni (Don't Believe in Silence), 1958
 Vyhnannie bludnicy (Eviction of the adulteress), 1961
 Dzieci adnaho doma (Children of one house), 1967
 I zmoukli ptushki (And the Birds Stopped Singing), 1971
 Ekzamen na vosien (Exam for the Autumn), 1973
 Batalija na luzie (The Battle on the Meadow), 1975
 Zalaty medal (The Gold Medal), 1979

Non-fiction
 Razmova z chytachom (Talking to the Reader), 1973
 Karenni i haliny (Roots and Branches), 1986
 Rozdum na aposhnim pierahonie: Dzionniki 1980–1995. (Thoughts before the last station: Diary 1980–1995), 1998

References

External links

A Plain Woman, a short story by Ivan Šamiakin

1921 births
2004 deaths
People from Dobruš District
Communist Party of the Soviet Union members
Tenth convocation members of the Supreme Soviet of the Soviet Union
Eleventh convocation members of the Supreme Soviet of the Soviet Union
Members of the Supreme Soviet of the Byelorussian Soviet Socialist Republic
Belarusian dramatists and playwrights
Belarusian male writers
Male dramatists and playwrights
Socialist realism writers
Soviet non-fiction writers
Soviet male writers
20th-century male writers
20th-century dramatists and playwrights
Belarusian novelists
Belarusian male short story writers
Male novelists
20th-century novelists
20th-century short story writers
20th-century Belarusian writers
Soviet military personnel of World War II
People's Writers of the Byelorussian SSR
Stalin Prize winners
Heroes of Socialist Labour
Recipients of the Order of Lenin
20th-century non-fiction writers
Male non-fiction writers